The Carver–Hawkeye Arena is a multi-purpose indoor arena located in Iowa City, Iowa. Opened in 1983, it is the home court for The University of Iowa Hawkeyes men's and women's basketball teams, as well as the university's wrestling, and gymnastics teams. It was named for the late industrialist Roy J. Carver of Muscatine, Iowa, a prominent statewide booster, who donated $9.2 million to The University of Iowa before his death in 1981.  Prior to the arena's opening, Iowa's athletic teams played at the Iowa Field House.

History
 
Prior to playing in Carver-Hawkeye Arena, Iowa teams played in Close Hall (1902-1905) and then the first Iowa Armory (1905-1922). The first Armory was at the site of the current UI Communications Center building currently sits, across from the Library on the East Side of the Iowa River. Iowa teams moved to the second Iowa Armory (1922-1926), and then to the adjoining Iowa Field House (1926-1982), built directly beside the second Iowa Armory, which was incorporated into the new Field House facility.  

In 1927, the Iowa Field House was opened during Paul Belding's tenure as athletic director.  Considered as a "magnificent structure for its day", the Field House was home to Iowa's basketball and wrestling teams and included an indoor track and swimming pool.

The Field House, however, was known for its steel balconies and sub-par acoustics, along with columns that obstructed views.  When demand was high for Hawkeye basketball, bleachers were placed behind the baskets, allowing some 15,000 to attend games.  Season ticket sales increased during the highly successful tenures of head coaches Ralph Miller and Lute Olson, and support for a new arena gradually increased.  Following approval from Iowa Board of Regents, construction of Carver-Hawkeye Arena began.

Entirely funded by private contributions, the arena was expected to be open for the 1982–83 school year, but weather slowed construction to the point where the first event was held on January 3, 1983. Iowa's wrestling team defeated Oklahoma and two days later, the men's basketball team played their first game – a loss to Michigan State – in the new arena.

An NCAA attendance record for women's basketball was set on February 3, 1985. 22,157 were in attendance at Carver-Hawkeye arena as Iowa lost to rival Ohio State.

Notable athletic events in the arena include the Big Ten and NCAA wrestling championships, the National Duals, the U.S. Olympic wrestling trials in 1984 and 2012, the UWW World Cup in 2018, and the NCAA Women's Division I Basketball Tournament.

The arena also serves as the site of commencement exercises for several of the university's colleges, and has hosted concerts by artists such as U2, Whitney Houston, Stevie Nicks, *NSYNC, Metallica, Guns N' Roses, Old Dominion, and Red Hot Chili Peppers, and speeches by Former Presidents Jimmy Carter and Bill Clinton as well as Desmond Tutu and Jane Goodall. Carver-Hawkeye also hosted many events in place of Hancher Auditorium and Cedar Rapids' U.S. Cellular Center while both venues underwent renovations after the Iowa flood of 2008.

On December 6, 2008, Iowa set the national collegiate wrestling dual meet attendance record as 15,955 fans packed the arena for Iowa-Iowa State match. The previous record of 15,646 was set Feb. 1, 2002, when Minnesota hosted Iowa at the Target Center in Minneapolis.  Tom Brands, Brent Metcalf, and Tony Ramos are the only Hawkeye wrestlers to never lose a match during their college career in Carver-Hawkeye Arena.

In 2016, a new scoreboard was added to the arena.

On 7-8 April 2018 Carver–Hawkeye Arena took senior freestyle wrestling international tournament World Cup 2018.

See also
 List of NCAA Division I basketball arenas

External links
Carver–Hawkeye Arena: The Home of the Hawkeyes  webpage (HawkeyeSports.com: Facilities)

References

College basketball venues in the United States
College gymnastics venues in the United States
College volleyball venues in the United States
College wrestling venues in the United States
Indoor arenas in Iowa
Iowa Hawkeyes basketball venues
Iowa Hawkeyes wrestling venues
Basketball venues in Iowa
Sports venues completed in 1983
University of Iowa campus
1983 establishments in Iowa